Dransfield is a surname. Notable people with the surname include:

 Barry Dransfield (b. 1947), English folk musician and sibling of Robin Dransfield
 Don Dransfield, Canadian politician
 John Dransfield (b. 1945), botanist specialising in palms and spouse of botanist Soejatmi Dransfield
 Joseph Dransfield (1827–1906), New Zealand politician
 Michael Dransfield (1948–1973), Australian poet
 Robin Dransfield, English folk musician and sibling of Barry Dransfield
 Soejatmi Dransfield (b. 1939), botanist and spouse of botanist John Dransfield

See also
 , an island in Saskatchewan, Canada

Dransfield